"La Di Die" (stylized in all lowercase) is a song by American singer-songwriter and TikTok personality Nessa Barrett featuring American singer-songwriter and TikTok personality Jxdn. It was released on February 19, 2021, via Warner Records. The song was written by Barrett, Jxdn, Lowell, Bülow, Leo Mellace, Sam Roman and Travis Barker, and produced by Leo Mellace, Sam Roman and Travis Barker.

Background and content
Barrett explained in a press release: "La Di Die' touches on how fame is dramatized and something most people wish for, when in reality, it's a dark and evil place. It was cool working with jxdn, not only is he my friend but a dope artist. He really helped make this song come to life!". Then Jxdn supplemented: "For me, this song represents that sometimes the hardest situation is the one that seems perfect. Don't ever be afraid to let people know you aren't where you wanna be. Set a goal, find a dream and make those reality. Live for others while being yourself; don't live for yourself while being like others".

Critical reception
Warner Music Australia described the song as "fus[ing] warm acoustic guitar and icy 808s, it builds towards Nessa's hypnotic promise 'La da di oh la di da, gonna be a superstar'. Jxdn pulls up with an instantly unforgettable melody as their voices seamlessly entwine."

Live performance
On April 7, 2021, Barrett and Jxdn performed the song on Jimmy Kimmel Live! Five days later, they performed the song on The Ellen DeGeneres Show.

Credits and personnel
Credits adapted from AllMusic.

 Alex Anders – recording
 Travis Barker – composer, producer
 Nessa Barrett – composer, primary Artist, vocals
 Elizabeth Lowell Boland – composer
 Bülow – composer
 Davide Cinci – recording
 Chris Galland – mixing engineer
 John Greenham – mastering
 Kevin Gruft – recording
 Jxdn – composer, featured artist
 Jeremie Inhaber – mixing
 Manny Marroquin – mixing
 Leo Mellace – composer, producer, recording
 Zach Pereyra – mixing engineer
 Sam Roman – composer, producer
 Anthony Vilchis – mixing engineer

Charts

Weekly charts

Year-end charts

Certifications

Release history

References

2021 singles
2021 songs
Songs written by Travis Barker
Warner Records singles
Number-one singles in Russia